The Ministry of Mass Media is a cabinet ministry of the Government of Sri Lanka responsible for the implementation of the Post Office Ordinance and the Stamp Ordinance of Sri Lanka. Aside from broader policy formulation, this also includes the maintenance and expansion of the Sri Lanka postal service, the design, release, sale and archiving of the country's postage stamps, representing Sri Lanka's interests at the Universal Postal Union, the oversight of banking, insurance and wire transfer services provided at postal offices.

The current Minister of Mass Media is Bandula Gunawardane. The ministry's secretary is W.A. Chulananda Perera.

Ministers
Parties

Secretaries

See also
Demographics of Sri Lanka
Sri Lanka Post

References

External links
 

Sri Lanka
Information and Mass Media
Information and Mass Media